A dividend aristocrat commonly refers to a company that is a member of the S&P 500 index and has increased its dividend for at least twenty-five consecutive years. This core definition is consistent with that of the S&P 500 Dividend Aristocrats. However, there are also different definitions. For example, the S&P MidCap 400 Dividend Aristocrats Index is composed of companies in the S&P MidCap 400 that have increased dividends for fifteen consecutive years.

Background

The first dividend aristocrat list was published in 1989, with twenty-six companies listed. The continuous increase in the dividend over twenty-five years is a quality feature, especially for long-term oriented investors.

See also
Dividend yield
S&P 500 Dividend Aristocrats

References

Dividends